1st SLGFCA Awards
February 10, 2005

Best Film: 
The Aviator

Best Director - comedy/musical: 
Alexander Payne
Sideways
Best Director - drama: 
Martin Scorsese
The Aviator
The  1st St. Louis Gateway Film Critics Association Awards  were announced on February 10, 2005. They were given for films opening prior to December 31, 2004.

Winners
Best Actor:
Jamie Foxx - Ray as Ray Charles
Best Actress:
Hilary Swank - Million Dollar Baby as Maggie Fitzgerald
Best Animated Film:
The Incredibles
Best Art Direction: (tie)
Sky Captain and the World of Tomorrow
The Aviator
Best Cinematography:
House of Flying Daggers as Zhao Xiaoding
Best Comedy/Musical:
Sideways
Best Director (Comedy/Musical):
Alexander Payne - Sideways
Best Director (Drama):
Martin Scorsese - The Aviator
Best Documentary Feature:
Fahrenheit 9/11
Best Film:
The Aviator
Best Foreign Language Film: (tie)
A Very Long Engagement (Un long dimanche de fiançailles) • France
The Motorcycle Diaries (Diarios de motocicleta) • Brazil
Best Score:
Ray
Best Screenplay:
Sideways - Alexander Payne and Jim Taylor
Best Supporting Actor:
Thomas Haden Church - Sideways as Jack Lopate
Best Supporting Actress:
Cate Blanchett - The Aviator as Katharine Hepburn
Best Visual Effects: (tie)
The Incredibles
Sky Captain and the World of Tomorrow

References

2004
2004 film awards
2004 in Missouri
St Louis